Keta Senior High Technical School (Ketasco) formerly Keta Secondary School is a mixed Public Senior High School located at Dzelukope a town in the Keta Municipal District of the Volta Region, Ghana.  The school has a student population of about 3,515 and a teaching staff strength of 150 as at 2020. Ketasco is the biggest school in Volta Region and one of the biggest in Ghana. The motto of the school is DZO LALI with the slogan Now or Never. The Eagle at the main gate is to remind students to always be like the Eagle.

History
Ketasco was established on the 27th of February, 1953, when some personalities were commissioned to start a day institution that would serve as a catchment school for the hosts of elementary schools scattered all over Keta. Ketasco started with  Nathan Quao, the educator, civil servant and diplomat as the Founding Headmaster and  twenty-two pioneering pupils. In 1961 the school moved to its present and permanent site.

Headmasters
The table below shows the list headmasters since the school was established and their tenure of office.

Courses offered
General Science
Business
General Arts
Home Economics
Technical
Visual Arts
Agricultural Science

Houses
There are four houses in the school which cater for males and females plus an additional hostel built by the Parent Teachers Association (PTA).The four traditional  houses are:

Quao
Quao is the premier House of Ketasco, named after the first Headmaster of the school Nathan Quao . It is called House One. The colour is Green and the Motto is FIRST AMONG EQUALS. It is sited very close to the main gate of the school. It is headed by Housemaster and three House Captains. At the girl's side, Quao House has a House mistress and three House Captains. The same structure is maintained in the three other houses. The Housemaster, Mr Foga Nukunu and  Housemistress, Ms Valerie Gogovie.

Fiawoo
It is also known as House Two. It was named after the first Chairman of the Board of Governors, Late Rev. Dr F. K Fiawoo. The colour is Blue. The Housemaster, Mr Francis Egbenya and Housemistress, Ms Ketemepi Imelda.

Abruquah
The third Headmaster of Ketasco was J. W Abruquah. The colour is Yellow. It is sited very close to the school gate. The Housemaster, Mr Evance Dzokanda and  Housemistress, Ms Testimony Agbetum.

Kotoka
This is House four and its color is Red. It was named in honour of Lieutenant General E.K. Kotoka, who led the 1966 Coup d'état. And the Housemaster, Mr Emmanuel Adonu and Housemistress, Ms Florence Kuwornu.

Note: Quao and Abruquah are also referred to as City while Kotoka and Fiawoo are called Zongo.

PTA HOSTEL

It was funded by the PTA (Parent Teacher Association). It is a modern edifice which houses only boys who could not get admission into the traditional houses.

Achievements 
 In 2011 Ketasco won the National Constitution Game Competition. 
 Ketasco won the National Human Rights Competition(December 2007) whipping PRESEC Legon in the Semi Finals.

  In 2014, Ketasco won the Sprite Ball Basketball Competition
  In 2012, Ketasco won the Montreal Protocol National Quiz Competition organized at Ola Senior High Secondary School. 
 Ketasco was the  first runner up for the Constitution Game Competition for three times. 
 The school  has won the Volta Regional Championship in the Constitution Game for four times. 
 Ketasco  has won the Regional Project Citizen contest.
 The school has  shown class in the National Science and Maths Quiz over the years. In 2017, they ousted a highly rated Opoku Ware School with 52 points as the against 37.
 In 2017, Keatsco took the App Silver award at the MTN APP Developer Challenger.
 In 2008,Ketasco were the first Volta region school to reach semi-finals and end in the fourth place

References

External links

High schools in Ghana
Boarding schools in Ghana
Presbyterian schools in Africa
Educational institutions established in 1953
Christian schools in Ghana
Public schools in Ghana
1953 establishments in Gold Coast (British colony)
Education in Volta Region